The 1948 Duke Blue Devils football team represented the Duke Blue Devils of Duke University during the 1948 college football season.

Schedule

References

Duke
Duke Blue Devils football seasons
Duke Blue Devils football